Hypolycaena kakumi, the Kakum fairy hairstreak, is a butterfly in the family Lycaenidae. It is found in eastern Ivory Coast, Ghana, Togo, Nigeria (the southern part of the country and the Cross River loop), Cameroon and the Republic of the Congo. The habitat consists of forests.

References

Butterflies described in 1997
Hypolycaenini